ScreaM Records is an EDM label established by South Korean record label SM Entertainment.

History 
In 2016, SM Entertainment executive producer Lee Soo-man introduced the EDM label ScreaM Records in the presentation show SMTOWN: New Culture Technology, 2016, held at the SM Town Coex Artium. According to Lee, the label aims to expand from "view and listen performance" to "enjoy performance together". The label was also designed to "promote music" through collaborations with global EDM DJs, producers, and various artists at South Korea and abroad.

The idea behind the creation of the label was made by Lee Seo-kyung, a former SM A&R overseas employee. Previously, Lee worked on Shinee's "View" (2015) and f(x)'s "4 Walls" (2015), which incorporated songs of the deep house genre into K-pop for the first time. Lee Soo-man gave his opinion and he accepted it. There was a speculation that SM The Performance might have brought Zedd's song with it. According to an interview between music critic Lee Dae-hwa and Lee Seo-kyung, it was planned as a label that covers the entire electronic music, but it was said that the word "EDM" was used to express it in empathetic terms.

Artists 

 DJ Hyo
 Ginjo
 IMLAY
 Raiden
 Mar Vista

Discography

Festivals and shows 

 Spectrum Dance Music Festival
ShowMe

References

External links 
 Official website

SM Entertainment subsidiaries
Electronic dance music record labels
South Korean record labels
Record labels established in 2016